Presidente Kennedy, Tocantins is a municipality in the state of Tocantins in the Northern region of Brazil.

See also
List of municipalities in Tocantins
List of memorials to John F. Kennedy

References

Municipalities in Tocantins